Exochognathus is a genus of leaf beetles in the subfamily Eumolpinae. It is endemic to Cuba, and contains only one species, Exochognathus limbatus. It was described by the American entomologist Doris Holmes Blake in 1946.

References

Eumolpinae
Beetles of North America
Insects of Cuba
Taxa named by Doris Holmes Blake
Monotypic Chrysomelidae genera
Endemic fauna of Cuba